Brighton Beach railway station is located on the Sandringham line in Victoria, Australia. It serves the south-eastern Melbourne suburb of Brighton, and it opened on 21 September 1861 as Beach. It was renamed Brighton Beach on 1 January 1867.

The famous Brighton Bathing Boxes are located a short walk from the station.

History

Brighton Beach station opened on 21 September 1861, when the railway line from North Brighton was extended. It remained a terminus until 2 September 1887, when the line was extended to Sandringham.

In 1968, boom barriers replaced interlocked gates at the South Road level crossing, located at the Down end of the station. The signal box that was built in 1926 for the level crossing still remains, and is located between the Down end of Platform 2 and the level crossing.

On 20 November 1995, Brighton Beach was upgraded to a Premium Station.

Following a 2019 commitment by the Federal Government, the station was due to receive an upgraded commuter car park. However, this was scrapped by the same government in 2021.

Platforms and services

Brighton Beach consists of an island platform with two faces and a side platform, being the only station on the Sandringham line to have three platforms. There is a large brick building on Platforms 1 and 2 (island platform), housing an enclosed waiting area, ticket facilities and toilets. There are also ticket facilities at the Up (Flinders Street) end of the island platform, for customers accessing Brighton Beach via the footbridge. Platform 3 has a smaller brick building, with a waiting area, ticket facilities and a payphone. Being a Premium Station, Brighton Beach is staffed from first to last train each day.

In 2011, a fence was erected on Platform 2 to direct passengers to the front half of the train and discourage them from boarding the rear half, because of the large gap between the train and the platform due to the station being built on a sharp curve. Additionally, station staff are required to be in attendance on Platform 2 for all train services, to ensure passengers have boarded safely, as there have been cases of passengers falling into the gap between the train and the platform.

A stabling yard is located adjacent to Platform 1. The yard was originally used for stabling, but was converted to a siding for the VICERS project. In 2010, the stabling facilities were reinstated. Two trains are stored overnight, and operate two early-morning city-bound services originating from Middle Brighton.

The station is served by Sandringham line trains.

Platform 1:
 No trains alight or board passengers from Platform 1, as it is used as a siding for rail services, with the platform currently closed off to passengers. Turn-back facilities at Brighton Beach are planned to be reinstated to allow for the use of this platform again in order to increase the frequency of services along the line, due to the single platform terminus at Sandringham.

Platform 2:
  all stations services to Flinders Street

Platform 3:
  all stations services to Sandringham

Transport links

Kinetic Melbourne operates three routes via Brighton Beach station, under contract to Public Transport Victoria:
 : Westfield Southland – St Kilda station
 : to The Alfred Hospital
 : Westfield Southland – St Kilda station

References

Further reading
"The Brighton Line in 1887" Gavan-Duffy, C.D. Australian Railway Historical Society Bulletin November 1960 pp174–179

External links
 Melway map at street-directory.com.au

Premium Melbourne railway stations
Railway stations in Melbourne
Railway stations in Australia opened in 1861
Railway stations in the City of Bayside